Modelo is a city in Santa Catarina, in the Southern Region of Brazil. The area was granted municipality status in 1961, its area being taken from the existing municipality of São Carlos; Three areas have subsequently been removed to form the new municipalities of Bom Jesus do Oeste, Serra Alta and Sul Brasil.

References

Municipalities in Santa Catarina (state)